General Israel Putnam, also known as Putnam's Escape at Horseneck, is an equestrian statue at the Putnam Memorial State Park in Redding, Connecticut, United States. The statue was designed by sculptor Anna Hyatt Huntington and dedicated in 1969 in honor of Connecticut native Israel Putnam, a military officer who served in the Continental Army during the American Revolutionary War.

History 
Israel Putnam was a military officer who served as a major general in the Continental Army during the American Revolutionary War. Putnam became a well-known historical figure for his actions during the war, which included leading troops at the Battle of Bunker Hill. In 1779, while in Greenwich, Connecticut, the 60-year-old Putnam was spotted by British troops, who proceeded to chase him on horseback. In one of his most well-known escapades, Putnam managed to escape capture by riding his horse down a notably steep hill that was considered unsafe for horse-riding.

More than a century later, this story inspired sculptor Anna Hyatt Huntington to create an equestrian statue memorializing the event. Huntington, who was born in 1876, was an American sculptor from the Boston area who was recognized by the Metropolitan Museum of Art as one of the preeminent female sculptors in the country and had studied the craft at the Art Students League of New York in the early 1900s. For some time, Huntington had lived in Redding, Connecticut, near the Putnam Memorial State Park, which had served as Putnam's winter encampment during the war. Huntington was especially renowned for her equestrian statues, with some of her more notable works including an equestrian statue of Joan of Arc in New York City and El Cid Campeador.

Working on the Putnam sculpture in 1966 at the age of 90, it would be the last of seven major equestrian statues she had created during her career, as well as one of the last works created before her death in 1973. Completed in 1967, the sculpture was donated to the Putnam Memorial State Park in 1969. It was dedicated on September 21, 1969, near the entrance of the park, with Albert D. Putnam, a descendant of Israel, giving the main speech at the ceremony, during which he stated that his ancestor had "rode down the hill to everlasting fame and into the heart of Mrs. Huntington". Another speech was given by Donald C. Matthews, Director of the Connecticut State Park and Forest Commission, who said: "We are here to honor two great citizens, General Israel Putnam and Mrs. Huntington, the most remarkable woman I have ever known."

In 1994, the monument was surveyed as part of the Save Outdoor Sculpture! project.

Design 
The sculpture depicts Putnam on horseback descending a flight of stairs, holding the reins in his left hand. His body is partially turned backwards and he is looking up and shaking his right fist in defiance. The horse's head is turned to the left and bears a terrified expression. The base of the sculpture bears some small inscriptions from the sculptor (ANNA H. HUNTINGTON / 1967 / STANERIGG), while a bronze plaque affixed to the pedestal bears the following inscription:

See also 
 List of equestrian statues in the United States

Notes

References

Sources

External links 

 

1969 establishments in Connecticut
1969 sculptures
American Revolutionary War monuments and memorials
Bronze sculptures in Connecticut
Equestrian statues in Connecticut
Outdoor sculptures in Connecticut
Redding, Connecticut
Sculptures of men in Connecticut